John McQuilliam (born 3 August 1962) is a Formula One car designer from England. He worked for Williams from 1986 and subsequently Arrows as a composite engineer before joining Jordan. After Jordan was purchased by Midland Group in 2005, McQuilliam remained with the team until it was sold again to Spyker Cars in 2007. At the end of 2007 he left Spyker and then worked for Wirth Research, a company owned by Nick Wirth, as an aerodynamics expert.

In March 2014, McQuilliam was back in F1 as a technical expert/designer for Marussia, which continued into 2015 with Manor Marussia F1 Team. For the 2016 season, he was appointed as Technical Director. After the demise of Manor Racing, McQuilliam joined Prodrive, working as Chief Engineer in their composites division.

References

External links
Profile at oldracingcars.com

1962 births
Living people
Formula One designers